The Men's 105 kg competition at the 2017 World Weightlifting Championships was held on 4 December 2017.

Schedule

Medalists

Records

Results

References

Men's 105 kg